Ilian is a masculine Bulgarian given name. Notable people with the name include:

 Ilian Aleksandrov (born 1972), Bulgarian gymnast
 Ilian Dimitrov (born 1953), Bulgarian boxer
 Ilian Djevelekov (born 1966), Bulgarian film director and producer
 Ilian Evtimov (born 1983), Bulgarian-French professional basketball player
 Ilian Gârnet (born 1983), Moldovan violinist
 Ilian Iliev (born 1968), Bulgarian football manager and former player
 Ilian Iliev (equestrian) (born 1966), Bulgarian equestrian
 Ilian Iliev (footballer, born 1999), Bulgarian professional footballer
 Ilian Iliev (weightlifter) (born 1973), Bulgarian weightlifter
 Ilian Kaziyski (born 1960), Bulgarian volleyball player
 Ilian Mihov (born 1966), Bulgarian economist
 Ilian Stoyanov (born 1977), Bulgarian former football defender
 Ilian Todorov, Bulgarian politician
 Ilian Vassilev (born 1956), Bulgarian diplomat, writer, and political blogger

See also
 Iliana, the feminine counterpart

Bulgarian masculine given names